Vacanze di Natale '90 (aka Christmas Vacation '90) is a 1990 Italian comedy film directed by Enrico Oldoini.

Plot
In residence in the mountains of St Moritz, intertwine the stories of five characters. Nick, a poor waiter, wins a bet on a horse race, but he loses his voice. So he goes on vacation meets a rich lady. Bindo and Toni, old friends, meet them after an argument, and one falls for the wife of the other. Arturo and Beppe, also friends, participating in races with runners, stay in a chalet near the residence of St Moritz. Arturo also falls in love with a woman, but she is the wife of his best friend...

Cast 

 Massimo Boldi as Bindo
 Christian De Sica as Toni
 Andrea Roncato as Beppe
 Ezio Greggio as Arturo Zampini
 Diego Abatantuono as  Nick
 Corinne Cléry as  Alessandra
 Moira Orfei as Gloria
 Giannina Facio as  Rita
 Maria Grazia Cucinotta as Arabella 
 Giovanna Pini as Gianna 
 Colette Poupon as Eliette
 Galeazzo Benti as Prince Galiberti
 Antonio Cantafora as Pippo
 Ugo Conti as Alvaro 
 Saverio Vallone as Lupo 
  Isaac George as Tumbo
 Paolo Paoloni as Eliette's Father

See also
 List of Christmas films

References

External links

1994 films
1990s Christmas comedy films
1990s Italian-language films
Films directed by Enrico Oldoini
Italian Christmas comedy films
1990s Italian films